Shari Ann Addison (born July 7, 1962), is an American gospel musician and artist.  Shari is the first runner-up on Sunday Best She started her music career, in 2009 with the release of Shari Addison by Verity Records, Zomba Records, and BET Records. This album was her breakthrough on the Billboard magazine charts, which it placed on The Billboard 200 and Gospel Albums charts.

Early life
Addison was born in Chicago, Illinois on July 7, 1962.

Music career
She was on season one of Sunday Best that she finished runner-up to Crystal Aikin. Her music recording career started in 2009, with the release of Shari Addison by Verity Records, Zomba Records, and BET Records on January 13, 2009. This album was her breakthrough release on the Billboard magazine charts, placing at No. 176 on The Billboard 200 along with No. 5 on the Gospel Albums. Both AllMusic and Cross Rhythms reviewed the album.

Personal life
Addison is married to Lewis Addison, and together they reside in Chicago, Illinois, and she has four daughters.

Discography

Studio albums

References

1962 births
Living people
African-American songwriters
African-American Christians
Musicians from Chicago
Songwriters from Illinois
Christians from Illinois
21st-century African-American people
20th-century African-American people